Adelphopoiesis, or adelphopoiia (from the Greek , derived from , , , and , , , literally 'brother-making') is a ceremony practiced historically in Orthodox-Christian tradition to unite together two people of the same sex (normally men) in a church-recognized relationship analogous to siblinghood.

Such ceremonies can be found in the history of the Catholic Church until the 14th century and in the Eastern Orthodox Church until the early 20th century. Documented in Byzantine manuscripts from the ninth to the fifteenth centuries, prayers established participants as 'spiritual brothers' and contained references to sainted pairs, including most notably Saints Sergius and Bacchus as well as Saints Cosmas and Damian, who were famous for their friendship." In England, some scholars believe an adelphopoiesis may have also taken place between William Neville (Lollard knight) and John Clanvowe.

In the late twentieth century, the Christian tradition gained notoriety as the focus of controversy involving advocates and opponents of secular and religious legalization of same-sex relationships.

Adelphopoiesis in Christian tradition

The Russian polymath scholar, priest, and martyr Pavel Florensky offered a famous description of adelphopoiesis in his monumental 1914 book The Pillar and the Ground of The Truth: An Essay in Orthodox Theodicy in Twelve Letters, which included an early bibliography on the topic.<ref>Florensky, The Pillar and Ground of the Truth', translated by Boris Jakim, Princeton 1997, p. 571-72.</ref> Florensky described traditional Christian friendship, expressed in adelphopoiesis, as "a community molecule [rather than an atomistic individualism], a pair of friends, which is the principle of actions here, just as the family was this kind of molecule for the pagan community," reflecting Christ's words that "wherever two or more of you are gathered in my name, there am I in the midst of thee." Florensky in his theological exegesis of the rite described an overlap of Christian agapic, philic, and erotic love in adelphopoiesis.  He defines erōs as "sensuous, passionate love," storgē  as "love of kith and kin," agapē as "love of valuation, respect," and philia as "love of inward acceptance, personal insight, friendliness." He then says, "But in fact, none of these words expresses the love of friendship that we are considering in the present letter, a love that combines the aspects of  philia, erōs, and agapē, a love the ancients attempted to express in some degree by the compound word philophrosunē." Were we to choose but one of these words, he says that "the most suitable word here is philein with its derivatives," such as philia ("friendship") and philos ("friend"). Within the Church, Florensky says that such philic relationships "blossom in sacramental adelphopoeisis [sic] and the co-partaking of the Holy Eucharist, and are nourished by this partaking for co-ascesis, co-patience, and co-martyrdom." A similar vocation to co-martyrdom is entailed in the Orthodox rite of marriage, which contains an invocation to the martyrs, who have received their crowns, but the various extant rites of Adelphopoiesis, though in some respects resembling the marriage rite, do not appear to contain any crowning such as takes place in the Orthodox rite of matrimony. Rather the ritual act, apart from co-communing in the Eucharist, that has commonly symbolized the adelphopoietic relationship in Russia, Greece, and other Orthodox countries has been an exchange of baptismal crosses (usually worn throughout life). This exchange has commonly taken place, not in public, but in a private encounter between those entering this philic relationship. Such a private exchange is depicted between Parfen and the prince in chapter 20 of Fyodor Dostoevsky's The Idiot:"You wish to exchange crosses? Very well, Parfen, if that's the case, I'm glad enough--that makes us brothers, you know."

The prince took off his tin cross, Parfen his gold one, and the exchange was made.

Parfen was silent. With sad surprise the prince observed that the look of distrust, the bitter, ironical smile, had still not altogether left his newly-adopted brother's face. At moments, at all events, it showed itself but too plainly.The relationship of "Cross-Brotherhood" appearing here in Dostoevsky's The Idiot seems but a sad mockery of the mutually-edifying, faithful, intimate relationship envisioned by Pavel Florensky as blossoming "in sacramental adelphopoeisis" [sic]. Florensky cites the relationship between Prince Jonathan and the future king David the Shepherd as an example of the quality of relationship his letter is expounding, citing First Samuel 18:1, 3-4; 20:4, 8, 17 and 41 as his evidence.  He writes that David's "friendship with Jonathan also rises above the level of the utilitarian friendship of the Old Testament and anticipates the tragic friendship of the New."

Alternative views are that this rite was used in many ways, such as the formation of permanent pacts between leaders of nations or between religious brothers. This was a replacement for "blood-brotherhood" which was forbidden by the church at the time. Others such as Brent Shaw have maintained also that these unions were more akin to "blood-brotherhood" and had no sexual connotation. 

Yet, explicitly contradicting the eros-excluding interpretations of the ritual is the Eastern Orthodox Church's own Book of Canon Law, the Pedalion, which, as reported by historian Franco Mormando, "acknowledges the frequently erotic nature of the relationship ritualized in the 'brotherhood by adoption' or 'wedbrotherhood' ceremony: in prohibiting the ceremony (in its chapter on marriage), the Pedalion states that wedbrotherhood 'merely affords matter for some persons to fulfill their carnal desires and to enjoy sensual pleasures, as countless examples of actual experience have shown at various times and in various places...'"

Rites for "adelphopoiesis" are contained in Byzantine manuscripts dating from the ninth to the 15th century.

"Same-sex union" or "brother-making"?
The ritual gained popular attention in the West, however, after Yale historian John Boswell in his book Same-sex unions in pre-modern Europe, also published as The marriage of likeness, argued that the practice was to unite two persons in a marriage-like union. His theory was disputed by other academic experts on the issue, notably historian Claudia Rapp in a special issue of the Catholic scholarly journal Traditio (vol. 52) in 1997, as well as Byzantine liturgical historian Stefano Parenti, who identified the origins of problems in Boswell's manuscript analysis. Boswell's work also was disputed by the religious community today descended most directly from that involved in the original practice, the Greek Orthodox Church, which regarded his work as a modern American cultural appropriation of its tradition, and translates adelphopoiesis as "fraternization," involving a chaste friendship. A similar translation of the term is "brother-making".

While many scholars criticized Boswell's findings, some agreed with him, including liberal American Episcopalian scholars Robin Scroggs and William L. Countryman.  Boswell gave text and translation for a number of versions of the "fraternization" ceremony in Greek, and translation for a number of Slavonic versions (Bratotvorenie or Pobratimstvo), although Rapp and others disputed the accuracy of his translations.  Boswell himself denied that adelphopoiesis should be properly translated as "homosexual marriage," but he argued that "brother-making" or "making of brothers" was an "anachronistically literal" translation and proposed "same-sex union" as the preferable rendering. Boswell's preference  was problematic to Eastern Orthodox canonists, as well as scholars such as Rapp, who argued that it involved an anachronistically modern secular epistemology and anthropology, different from traditional Christianity. Boswell suggested a potential parallel to modern constructions of sexual identity, although the rites for adelphopoiesis explicitly highlighted the spiritual nature of the union in premodern Christian terms.

Some more recent scholarship has investigated Boswell's claim along ethnographic lines. Nik Jovčić-Sas in his piece "The Tradition of Homophobia: Responses to Same-Sex relationships in Serbian Orthodoxy from the nineteenth century to the present day" highlights the distinctly sexual and romantic qualities of Pobratimstvo recorded in Serbia from the 19th and early 20th centuries. Looking at the work of anthropologists and ethnographers such as Mary Edith Durham, Paul Näcke, Dinko Tomašić and Tih R. Gregorovitch Jovčić-Sas argues that brotherhood unions were not simply platonic or political unions, as taught by the Serbian Orthodox Church. He also draws attention to the effects of Western European cultural shaming upon Serbian society--a shame resulting in suppression and cultural amnesia regarding the actual praxis and embodiment of Pobratimstvo in earlier same-sex relationships.

Boswell commented on the lack of any equivalent in the Western Latin Rite of the Roman Catholic Church, but the British historian Alan Bray in his book The Friend, gave a Latin text and translation of a Latin Catholic Rite from Slovenia, entitled Ordo ad fratres faciendum, literally "Order for the making of brothers". Allan Tulchin, "Same-Sex Couples Creating Households in Old Regime France: The Uses of the Affrèrement" in the Journal of Modern History: September 2007, argued that the ceremony of affrèrement in France joined unrelated same-gender couples in lifelong unions, who then could raise family, hold property jointly, and were in all respects the same as or equivalent to marriages in terms of law and social custom, as shown by parish records. These were not, however, contiguous with the earlier Eastern tradition, and not described in sexual terms in parallel to modern concepts of sexual identity.

Boswell's critics

Halsall (1996) has produced a detailed list of debates (including reviews by supporters and skeptics) surrounding Boswell's works. The following are sourced from some of the more prominent critics.

Historian Robin Darling Young (herself a participant in a Syriac Oriental Orthodox adelphopoiesis ceremony) and Brent Shaw, have also criticized Boswell's methodology and conclusions.

Archimandrite Ephrem Lash criticized Boswell's book in the February 1995 issue of Sourozh.  According to Ephrem, Boswell mistranslates, misinterprets, and tendentiously organizes texts, and his "knowledge of Orthodox liturgiology is, in effect, non-existent."  With regard to Boswell's central claim to have found evidence for the use of wedding crowns in the rite for making brothers, Ephrem notes that what the relevant text says, "somewhat literally translated," is this: "It is inadmissible for a monk to receive [anadochos is a standard Greek word for 'godparent'] children from holy baptism, or to hold marriage crowns or to make brother-makings.  [150:124]"  In other words, "monks are forbidden to do the following: 1. To act as godfathers at baptisms, 2. To act as supporters of bridal couples, 3. To enter into brotherly unions.  These are, of course, the natural consequences of a monk's having given up all ties of earthly relationships."  Turning back to Boswell's thesis, Ephrem writes, "What does Boswell make of this?  Here is his paraphrase of the text given above: 'monks must also not select boys at baptism and make such unions with them'.  There is absolutely nothing in the text to suggest that the three prohibitions are linked in the way Boswell implies, nor that the 'children' are 'boys' – the Greek has the neuter, paidia.  In short, this first piece of evidence for the use of crowns in the ceremony of brother-making is not evidence for anything, except Boswell's ignorance, not to mention the prurient suggestion that Byzantine monks went round selecting suitable boys at baptism so as to 'marry' them later on."

In his review of the book, Miodrag Kojadinović says: "The book is a scientific treatise abundant with references. But it starts from a premise that to me seems insufficiently proven. It chooses to see, based on relatively meagre evidence, a very idiosyncratic relationship sanctioned among certain ethnic groups as a precursor to California bunnies' white weddings. It goes so far to refer to the emperor Basil as a 'hunk'. It neglects the fact that adelphopoiesis/pobratimstvo can be achieved through simple invocation: 'My-Brother-Through-God!' in case of peril. A foe suddenly turns an ally."

A recent study by Claudia Rapp also argues against some of Boswell's main conclusions. In his review of Rapp's book, Gabriel Radle offers some important critiques: Rapp is certainly correct that Boswell exaggerated the ritual relationship between [the rites of marriage and adelphopoiesis]. However, she drifts close to the opposite extreme of highlighting the ritual dissimilarity to the point of playing down some of the common features (Rapp, p. 72-76). For example, to refute Boswell's claims, Rapp points out that a ritual handclasp—a central gesture of the wedding ceremony—only appears in the rite of adelphopoiesis in two, late manuscripts. Yet elsewhere in her book, Rapp cites early literary sources that likewise allude to a handclasp as part of monastic pairing ritual.Radle also points out that in the liturgical prayers of both matrimony and adelphopoiesis, the respective rites speak of "a yoked partnership" (syzygos, Rapp, p. 173), but Rapp fails to point out the use of the same expression for both rites. Radle states that since Josephite marriage and adelphopoiesis emerged at the same time, scholars would do well to explore how these two types of relational bonds differ from one another.

See also
 Bromance
Confraternities
 David and Jonathan
 Female bonding
 Law of adoption (Mormonism)
 Male bonding
 Philia
 Platonic love
 Romantic friendship
 Soulmate
Sodalities
 Womance

Notes

References

External links
Description of Adelphopoiesis ceremony, Orthodox History.org
Gay Marriage: Reimagining Church History, First Things Ευαγγ. Ι. Ντόντη. Ήθη και έθιμα: Αδελφοποιΐα (αδελφοποιτοί - βλάμηδες).'' Βλάχοι.net (Vlahoi.net). 20 Αυγούστου 2006.

Christian worship and liturgy
Christian terminology
History of Eastern Christianity
Medieval LGBT history
LGBT and Christianity
Same-sex unions